Wacht am Rhein (English: The watch/guard on the Rhine) may refer to:

"Die Wacht am Rhein", German patriotic song
 Unternehmen: Wacht am Rhein, German codeword for the operation known to the Allies as the Battle of the Bulge.

See also
Watch on the Rhine (disambiguation)